is the 21st single by Japanese idol girl group Nogizaka46. The center position of the title track is held by Asuka Saito. It was released on 8 August 2018. It reached number-one on the weekly Oricon Singles Chart with 989,000 copies sold. It was also number-one on the Billboard Japan Hot 100.

Release 
This single was released in 5 versions. Type-A, Type-B, Type-C, Type-D and a regular edition.

Track listing
All lyrics written by Yasushi Akimoto.

Type-A

Type-B

Type-C

Type-D

Regular Edition

Participating members

"Jikochū de Ikō!" 
Center: Asuka Saitō

3rd Row: Kazumi Takayama, Yuri Saitō, Ayane Suzuki, Minami Hoshino, Mai Shinuchi, Sayuri Inoue

2nd Row: Manatsu Akimoto, Misa Etō, Momoko Ōzono, Minami Umezawa, Renka Iwamoto, Sayuri Matsumura

1st Row: Erika Ikuta, Yūki Yoda, Nanase Nishino, Asuka Saitō , Mai Shiraishi, Miona Hori, Mizuki Yamashita

Chart performance

Oricon

Billboard Japan

Year-end charts

References

2018 singles
2018 songs
Japanese-language songs
Nogizaka46 songs
Oricon Weekly number-one singles
Billboard Japan Hot 100 number-one singles
Song articles with missing songwriters
Songs with lyrics by Yasushi Akimoto